Nathan Greene may refer to:
Nathan Greene (lawyer) (c. 1902–1964), American lawyer
Nathan S. Greene (1810–1900), American businessman and politician

See also
Nathan Green (disambiguation)
Nathaniel Greene (disambiguation)